4,4′-Biphenol is an organic compound which is a phenolic derivative of biphenyl. It is a colorless solid.

4,4′-Biphenol is prepared by dealkylation of the tetra-t-butyl derivative, generated by the oxidative coupling of 2,6-di-tert-butylphenol.  The oxidative coupling of phenol itself typically gives a mixture of isomers.  For example, VCl4 reacts with phenols give 4,4′-, 2,4′-, and 2,2′-biphenols: 
2 C6H5OH + 2 VCl4 → HOC6H4–C6H4OH  +  2 VCl3 + 2 HCl

An earlier process using oxygen and copper salts to enable the oxidative coupling was reported

Safety
4,4'-Biphenol had actually been elucidated to have an œstrogenic SAR.

See Also
Bisphenol

References

Phenols
Biphenyls